The Aon Center (200 East Randolph Street, formerly Amoco Building) is a modern supertall skyscraper in the Chicago Loop, Chicago, Illinois, United States, designed by architect firms Edward Durell Stone and The Perkins and Will partnership, and completed in 1974 as the Standard Oil Building. With 83 floors and a height of 1,136 feet (346 m), it is the fourth-tallest building in Chicago, surpassed in height by Willis Tower, Trump International Hotel and Tower, and St Regis Chicago.

The building is managed by Jones Lang LaSalle, which is also headquartered in the building. Aon Center also houses the headquarters of Aon and one of Kraft Heinz's two headquarters (the other being in Pittsburgh), and the former world headquarters of Amoco prior to its acquisition by BP.

The building was briefly the tallest in Chicago, but was soon surpassed by the Sears Tower (now known as the Willis Tower). However, the Aon Building was the fourth-tallest completed building in the world at the time of its completion.

History

Construction

The Standard Oil Building was constructed as the headquarters of the Standard Oil Company of Indiana, which had previously been housed at South Michigan Avenue and East 9th Street. When it was completed in 1973, it was the tallest completed  building in Chicago and the fourth-tallest in the world, earning it the nickname "Big Stan". In 1974, the taller Sears Tower (now Willis Tower) in Chicago surpassed it as the tallest completed building in Chicago (the Sears Tower was also the tallest in the world). However, the Sears Tower had already been topped out in May 1973. When the Aon Center opened as the fourth-tallest completed building in the world, it was only exceeded in height by the twin towers of the original World Trade Center and the Empire State Building in New York City. Originally clad in marble, the Aon Center was also the tallest marble-clad building in the world.

The building employs a tubular steel-framed structural system with V-shaped perimeter columns to resist earthquakes, reduce sway, minimize column bending, and maximize column-free space.  This construction method was also used for the original World Trade Center twin towers in New York City.

Refacing

When completed, it was the world's tallest marble-clad building, sheathed entirely with 43,000 slabs of Italian Carrara marble.  The marble used was thinner than previously attempted in cladding a building, which soon proved to be a mistake.  On December 25, 1973, during construction a 350-pound marble slab detached from the façade and penetrated the roof of the nearby Prudential Center.  In 1985, inspection found numerous cracks and bowing in the marble cladding of the building.  To alleviate the problem, stainless steel straps were added to hold the marble in place.  Later, from 1990 to 1992, the entire building was refaced with Mount Airy white granite at an estimated cost of over $80 million. Amoco was reluctant to divulge the actual amount, but it was well over half the original price of the building, without adjustment for inflation. Two-thirds of the discarded marble was crushed and used as landscaping decoration at Amoco's refinery in Whiting, Indiana, one-sixth was donated to Governors State University, in University Park, and one-sixth donated to Regalo, a division of Lashcon Inc.  Under a grant from the Illinois Department of Rehabilitative Services, Regalo's 25 handicapped workers carved the discarded marble into a variety of specialty items such as corporate gifts and mementos including desk clocks and pen holders. The building's facade somewhat resembles that of the North and South tower of the former World Trade Center Complex due to the upward flow of the columns.

Designation
The Standard Oil Building was renamed the Amoco Building when the company changed names in 1985.  In 1998, Amoco sold the building to The Blackstone Group for an undisclosed amount, estimated to be between $430 and $440 million. It was renamed as the Aon Center on December 30, 1999, although the Aon Corporation would not become the building's primary tenant until September 2001.  In May 2003, Wells Real Estate Investment Trust, Inc. acquired the building for between $465 and $475 million. On August 10, 2007, Wells Real Estate Investment Trust, Inc. changed its name to Piedmont Office Realty Trust, Inc.)

Real estate investors Mark Karasick and Victor Gerstein acquired the building from Piedmont in 2015 for $713 million.

Planned observation deck
On May 14, 2018, the building's owners unveiled $185 million proposal for an observatory featuring a thrill ride on the roof called the Sky Summit, the world's tallest exterior elevator, and new entrance pavilion. The observatory was supposed to be completed in 2022, but the COVID-19 pandemic has delayed construction plans by about a year.

Exterior lighting
In recent years, the top floors of the building have been lit at night with colors to reflect a particular season or holiday.  Orange is used for Thanksgiving, green or red for Christmas, and pink during Breast Cancer Awareness Month. The lighting commonly matches the nighttime lighting on the antenna of Willis Tower, the John Hancock Center and the upper floors of the Merchandise Mart.

Plaza
In the plaza, there is a sounding sculpture by Harry Bertoia.

Position in Chicago's skyline

Gallery

See also

 Aon Center (Los Angeles)
 First Canadian Place – a similar building from the same architect
 List of buildings
 List of skyscrapers
 List of tallest buildings and structures in the world
 List of tallest buildings in Chicago
 List of tallest buildings in the United States
 List of tallest freestanding structures in the world
 List of tallest freestanding steel structures

References

External links

 Aon Center on CTBUH Skyscraper Center
 List of tenants at the Aon Center - Companies located at 200 East Randolph Street, Chicago IL

Skyscraper office buildings in Chicago
Insurance company headquarters in the United States
Amoco
BP buildings and structures
Office buildings completed in 1973
Edward Durell Stone buildings
JLL (company)
International style architecture in Illinois
Modernist architecture in Illinois
1973 establishments in Illinois